Traces  is a British television crime drama produced by Red Production Company (a StudioCanal company). Co-created and written by Val McDermid and Amelia Bullmore, and based upon an original idea by McDermid, it originally premiered on Alibi on 9 December 2019. The series was rerun on BBC One on 4 January 2021 and Series One began repeating on Drama on 15 January 2022. A second six-episode season was released in February 2022.

Synopsis
Traces focuses on three female forensic professionals, Emma Hedges, Sarah Gordon and Kathy Torrance, working together at the fictitious Scottish Institute of Forensic Science and Anatomy (SIFA) in Dundee, Scotland, as they uncover the truth of a murder case and bring a killer to justice.

Cast
In the first series, the cast was as follows:
Molly Windsor as Emma Hedges, a lab technician who has moved back to her birthplace of Dundee, for her new job, and in search of answers about her mother's murder.
Laura Fraser as Professor Sarah Gordon, professor of Chemistry at the University of Tayside and Emma's new boss at SIFA.
Jennifer Spence as Professor Kathy Torrence, a professor of forensic anthropology at the University of Tayside and a colleague at SIFA.
Martin Compston as Daniel MacAfee, director of a construction company and romantic interest of Emma.
Vincent Regan as Phil MacAfee, Daniel's father and former director of MacAfee Construction.
Michael Nardone as Detective Inspector Neil McKinven, a friend of Professor Gordon who has insight on the Marie Monroe case.
Phil McKee as Jimmy Levin, husband of Marie Monroe and Emma's stepfather.
John Gordon Sinclair as Drew Cubbin, Emma's father and ex-partner of Marie Monroe.
Morayo Akandé as Detective Constable Trina Adeboyo, colleague of DI McKinven at Police Scotland.
Jamie Marie Leary as Skye Alessi, Emma's childhood best friend.
Carly Anderson as Marie Monroe, Emma's mother who was murdered in 2001, and whose case remains unsolved.
Laurie Brett as Izzy Alessi, best friend of Marie Monroe, and mother to Emma's childhood best friend Skye.
Joana Borja as Dr. Pia Salvador, forensic scientist and love interest of Professor Torrence.
Andrea Hart as Janine Muir, SIFA's receptionist.
Anna Leong Brophy as Louise Chiu Jones, chemist and Emma's colleague at SIFA who works alongside her in the lab.
Neve McIntosh as Julie Hedges, Emma's maternal aunt, who adopted her after the murder of her mother and took her to Manchester.
Janey Godley as Clare Tindall, a criminal defence lawyer who represents Daniel.

Production
Traces is set in and around Dundee, but the majority of the series was filmed in Bolton, England. The theme tune is a cover of Nina Simone's "Don't Let Me Be Misunderstood" by Valerie Broussard.

Episodes

Series overview

Series 1 (2019)

Series 2 (2022)

Critical reception
Stuart Heritage reviewing on behalf of The Guardian rated the series three stars out of five, and whilst acknowledging the series is loaded with talent, said "this is what happens when TV runs out of new shows". The Times awarded the series two out of five stars with Carol Midgley saying that "the biggest crime here so far is a lack of flavour".

References

External links

2019 British television series debuts
2010s British crime drama television series
2020s British crime drama television series
BBC crime television shows
Television shows set in Scotland
Television series by Red Production Company
UKTV original programming
BBC television dramas
British thriller television series
English-language television shows